Events from the year 1739 in Russia

Incumbents
 Monarch – Anna

Events

  
 
  
  
 
 
  
 Austro-Russian–Turkish War (1735–39)
 Battle of Stavuchany
 Minusinsk
 Treaty of Niš (1739)

Births

 October 11 - Grigory Potemkin (died 1791)

Deaths

References

1739 in Russia
Years of the 18th century in the Russian Empire